Bok Hyeon (born February 11, 1997), known professionally as Khundi Panda, is a South Korean rapper and songwriter. He released collaborative album Reconstruction with record producer Viann in 2017 and his debut studio album Garosawk in 2020. Both albums won Best Rap Album at the Korean Music Awards. In 2020, he appeared on Show Me the Money 9 and gained popularity. "VVS", a song he released on the show, peaked at number one on the Gaon Digital Chart and won Hip-hop Track of the Year at the Korean Hip-hop Awards.

Early life 
Bok Hyeon became interested in music after listening to Epik High's songs. He adopted the stage name "Khundi Panda" from a fictional character that he made after reading fantasy novels and comic books.

Career 
In 2017, Khundi Panda released his debut single "Ms. 808". He released collaborative album Reconstruction with record producer Viann in the same year, which later won Best Rap Album at the Korean Music Awards. In 2019, he signed to Dejavu Group, a label found by Bewhy. 

In July 2020, he released his debut studio album Garosawk, which later won Best Rap Album at the Korean Music Awards. In October 2020, he appeared on Show Me the Money 9 where he released "VVS" with Mirani, Munchman, and Mushvenom. It became his most successful single, charting at number 1 on the Gaon Digital Chart for seven consecutive weeks and winning Hip-Hop Track of the Year at the Korean Hip-hop Awards. He also released singles "The Roots" and "Hero" on the show and was eliminated in the semi-final. In 2021, he released his second studio album The Spoiled Child which received critical acclaim.

Discography

Studio albums

Collaboration album

Singles

Filmography

TV

Awards and nominations

References

External link 

 

1997 births
Living people
Show Me the Money (South Korean TV series) contestants
South Korean male rappers